Muir of Allangrange is a scattered crofting township, lying 3 miles northeast of Muir of Ord on the western side of the Black Isle, in Ross-shire, Scottish Highlands and is in the Scottish council area of Highland.

References

Populated places on the Black Isle